Anytos or Anytus was one of the Titans of Greek mythology. He was supposed to have raised Despoina, and in Arcadia during Pausanias' time the two were represented by statues in a temple near Acacesium.

Notes

References
 Pausanias, Pausanias Description of Greece with an English Translation by W.H.S. Jones, Litt.D., and H.A. Ormerod, M.A., in 4 Volumes. Cambridge, Massachusetts, Harvard University Press; London, William Heinemann Ltd. 1918. Online version at the Perseus Digital Library.
 Smith, William; Dictionary of Greek and Roman Biography and Mythology, London (1873). Online version at the Perseus Digital Library

Titans (mythology)